Mario Roques (1 July 1875 – 8 March 1961) was a French scholar, professor of history of medieval literature and renowned Romance philologist. He translated and edited Le Roman de Renart.

Biography 
Mario Roques was born in Peru where his father was a consular agent<ref>Pierre Chantraine, Éloge funèbre de Mario Roques, membre de l'Académie', Comptes-rendus des séances de l'Académie des inscriptions et belles-lettres, 1961, 105-1, (p. 83–88)</ref> He started studying at the École Normale Supérieure (ENS) from 1894 while following courses at the École nationale des chartes as an auditor. In 1895, he joined the École pratique des hautes études (EPHE) where he trained in Romance philology under the guidance of Gaston Paris and Antoine Thomas. His teaching career began early and led him to teach at the ENS, the EPHE (where he would succeed Gaston Paris), the Institut national des langues et civilisations orientales (where he taught the Romanian and Albanian languages and of which he was appointed director, that is to say director, 1936), the Sorbonne and the Collège de France.

The following year, he succeeded Paul Meyer at the head of the journal Romania, which he would manage until his death.

 Bibliography 
1912: The Boy and the Blind Man : jeu du XIIIe, (reissue in 2005 with the addition of a long literary introduction and a file containing extracts of texts thematically related by Jean Dufournet)
 1931: Le Roman du comte d'Anjou de Jehan Maillart 
 1936: Aucassin and Nicolette 
 1948: Le Roman de Renart 
 1951: Le Roman de Renart 1952: Les romans de Chrétien de Troyes : I Érec et Enide 1955: Le Roman de Renart 1956: Roland à Saragosse, poème méridional du XIVe siècle 
 1957: L'Estoire de Griseldis en rimes et par personnages.
 1958: Le Roman de Renart 1958: Le Chevalier à la charrette 1959: La Farce du pauvre Jouhan (in collaboration with Eugénie Droz).
 1960: Le Roman de Renart 1960: Yvain, the Knight of the Lion 
 1963: Le Roman de Renart''

References

External links 
 Mario Roques on data.bnf.fr
 Notice sur la vie et les travaux de M. Mario Roques on Persée
 Biographie on Persée
 Notice on the site  of the Académie royale de langue et de littérature françaises de Belgique

Romance philologists
Albanologists
20th-century French writers
20th-century French historians
Literary historians
French medievalists
French philologists
École Normale Supérieure alumni
Academic staff of the École Normale Supérieure
École pratique des hautes études alumni
Academic staff of the Collège de France
Members of the Académie des Inscriptions et Belles-Lettres
Members of the Institute for Catalan Studies
1875 births
People from Callao
1961 deaths
Corresponding Fellows of the Medieval Academy of America